is a Kuiper-belt object with a diameter of . It has an absolute magnitude of approximately 4.42, and albedo around 26%. It was discovered on 12 December 2004 at Palomar Observatory.

It is currently at 35.8 AU from the Sun, near its perihelion.

References

External links 
 

230965
230965
230965
20041212